The 2015 Saginaw Sting season was the seventh season for the American Indoor Football (AIF) franchise, and their first season in the AIF.

In October 2014, the Sting announced they would be joining American Indoor Football (AIF). The Sting also announced the hiring of Greg Wasmer as the franchise's new head coach. After a 0-2 start for the Sting, Wasmer was fired and owner Stuart Schweigert was named the head coach of the Sting.

Regular season

Schedule

Standings

Postseason

Roster

Coaching staff

References

Saginaw Sting
Saginaw Sting
Saginaw Sting